Mark Sutcliffe (born July 14, 1968) is a Canadian politician who has been the 59th mayor of Ottawa since 2022. Before entering politics, he hosted Ottawa Today on 1310News radio.

Early life
Mark Sutcliffe was born at the Riverside Hospital on July 14, 1968, the son of John Michael Sutcliffe and Florence Ng-Yelim. Sutcliffe's maternal grandfather, Xavier, was born to a Chinese family in Mauritius in 1902. Sutcliffe's maternal grandmother, Yolande, was French, and the two moved to Shanghai. The family moved to Canada during the Chinese Civil War. John Sutcliffe was also an immigrant, coming from Yorkshire in England. John and Florence met while working at the Metropolitan Life Insurance Company.

Sutcliffe grew up in McKellar Park in the city's west end. He graduated from St. Pius X High School, and then studied political science at Carleton University for one year before dropping out to take a job at the CHEZ 106 radio station. At the same time, he started working as a news reader at CFRA, and then became a news reporter for the Ottawa Business News, and was the first play-by-play announcer for the Ottawa Lynx baseball team. He then founded the Ottawa Business Journal, where he met his wife, Ginny.

Political career 
Sutcliffe was elected mayor of Ottawa following the 2022 municipal election. He is the first Chinese Canadian mayor of Ottawa, as well as its first mayor from a visible minority group.

Electoral record

References

1968 births
Living people
Mayors of Ottawa
Canadian journalists of Chinese descent
Canadian politicians of Chinese descent
Canadian people of French descent
Canadian people of English descent
Businesspeople from Ottawa
Canadian male journalists
Canadian radio journalists
Canadian television journalists
Journalists from Ontario
Carleton University alumni
21st-century Canadian politicians